

Early years
The Institute for Community Studies is a community-led research and evidence centre based in Bethnal Green, East London. Originally founded in 1953 by Michael Young as the Institute of Community Studies, it is probably best known for the 1957 report by Young and his colleague Peter Willmott, Family and Kinship in East London, which argued for the continuing importance of community ties in the age of the welfare state. Described as a sociological "phenomenon", the original Institute influenced a generation of sociologists and social historians.

Other key publications from that period include:

 The Family Life of Old People: An inquiry in East London (Peter Townsend, 1957).
 Widows and their Families (Peter Marris, 1958).
 Family and Class in a London Suburb (Peter Willmott and Michael Young, 1960).
 Family and Social Change in an African City: A study of rehousing in Lagos (Peter Marris, 1961).
 Education and the Working Class (Brian Jackson, Dennis Marsden, 1962).
 Living with Mental Illness: A study in East London (Enid Mills, 1962).
 The Evolution of a Community: A Study of Dagenham after forty years (Peter Willmott, 1963).
 Human Relations and Hospital Care (Ann Cartwright, 1964).
 Innovation and Research in Education (Michael Young, 1965).
 Adolescent Boys of East London (Peter Willmott, 1966).
 Working Class Community (Brian Jackson, 1968).
 The Symmetrical Family: A study of work and leisure in the London Region (Michael Young and Peter Willmott, 1973).

The original Institute was also the main vehicle through which Young created over 60 organisations including the Open University and the Consumers' Association (aka Which?). In 2005, the Institute of Community Studies merged with the Mutual Aid Centre and was renamed The Young Foundation in honour of Lord Young. The current chief executive of the Young Foundation is Helen Goulden and the Institute is led by Associate Director, Richard Harries.

A fresh start
The Institute was re-launched in 2019 with support from the Power to Change Trust, Friends Provident Foundation and a large private donation, with a remit to promote positive social, economic and environmental outcomes by better understanding how government and philanthropic interventions affect – and are affected by – the individuals, families and businesses that make up our local communities.

The Institute for Community Studies describes itself as "a new kind of research institute, with people and communities at its heart". It places particular emphasis on the role of communities themselves in the research process, both in determining the research questions to be answered and through the use of so-called peer researchers (also known as community-based participatory researchers) to collect evidence. In its first major publication, based on a coordinated series of national surveys and regional focus groups across the United Kingdom, the Institute identified seven priority areas for further research.

Notes

Organisations based in the London Borough of Tower Hamlets
Social science institutes
Independent research institutes
Research institutes established in 1954
Research institutes in London